The following is an episode list for Aardman Animations' children's comedy series, Shaun the Sheep, in chronological order of first airing on BBC One & CBBC.

Series overview

Regular series

Films

Special series

Episodes

Series 1 (2007)

Series 1 utilized single frame recording with an SDTV professional video camera to create the animation.

Series 2 (2009–2010)
Series 2 consists of 40 episodes and commenced airing in the United Kingdom on 23 November 2009 on BBC One and BBC HD. It had already started airing in Germany on 18 October 2009. The series director was Chris Sadler. This series was shot with digital camera still images that were edited into high definition video. There were major changes in the looks of the characters (e.g., The pigs are slimmer,Timmy’s mom’s eyes are big and connected the Farmer now has molded line separating his stubble and Bitzer and Pidsley now have detailed fur), the bull was absent throughout the whole series and the title sequence was also adapted to reflect these changes.

Series 3 (2012)
Bitzer has now returned to using his series 1 model, and Pidsley was removed starting this season. The farmer's glasses are now square shaped and the bull has returned. Also, the theme song is rerecorded by Mark Thomas and Vic Reeves. All episodes premiered in Germany on the KiKa channel between 30 November and 9 December 2012. In the UK, it ran between 25 February 2013 and 21 March 2013 on the CBBC channel.

Series 4 (2014)
The first 20 episodes of the fourth series, consisting of 30 episodes in total, began airing on 3 February 2014 on CBBC.
Another ten episodes began airing on the Australian television channel ABC3 starting from 17 September 2014. These episodes began on CBBC on 8 December 2014.

Series 5 (2016)

A fifth series began airing on CBBC on 5 September 2016. The season first aired in the Netherlands from 1 December 2015 to 1 January 2016 and in Australia in January 2016. Mark Thomas and Vic Reeves once again rerecorded the theme tune, as it sounds slightly different.

Series 6 (2020)
A sixth series began airing in 2020 on Netflix under the subtitle Adventures from Mossy Bottom. The series reduced The Bull, extending The Goat's appearance instead. New characters appeared in the series, such as Stash the Squirrel and Farmer Ben, which affected the changed intro, now with three various variants. This was the only time throughout the series for all 20 episodes to be aired on the same day, 16 March 2020. CBBC, BBC iPlayer and BBC Two ordered 20x7 minute episodes for September 2022.

Specials (2015–2021)

Films

Other broadcasts

Shaun the Sheep 3D (2012)
The following is a list of 1-minute stereoscopic 3D shorts created by Aardman for the Nintendo 3DS' Nintendo Video service. These shorts used a slightly smaller team of artists than the main series. Beginning on 15 January 2016, the shorts were released every Friday on the official Shaun the Sheep YouTube channel as "Mossy Bottom Shorts". These versions lack the 3D effect found on the Nintendo 3DS but have high-definition resolution.

Shaun The Sheep Championsheeps (2012)
The following is a list of 1-minute sports-themed shorts that aired on CBBC in July 2012. They were made to coincide with the London 2012 Olympics celebrations.  it aired on PBS Kids in August 2013 and BBC Kids in October 2013.

Notes

References

Shaun the Sheep
Shaun the Sheep episodes
Shaun the Sheep episodes